Ellicott Rock Wilderness is managed by the United States Forest Service and is part of the National Wilderness Preservation System. It was first designated by Congress in 1975 with the Eastern Wilderness Act. The majority of this land (approximately 3,300 acres) lays in South Carolina. Additional lands were added to Ellicott Rock Wilderness in 1984 with the passing of the North Carolina Wilderness Act and the Georgia Wilderness Act, today designated wilderness totals . Ellicott Rock Wilderness is the only wilderness that straddles three states, with boundaries located around the point at which Georgia, North Carolina, and South Carolina come together. Ellicott Rock Wilderness also spans three National Forests. The Andrew Pickens Ranger district on the Sumter National Forest recommended the Ellicott Rock Extension as wilderness in 1995 in their Resource Management Plan. Although not fully designated, recommended wilderness is managed as if it were designated wilderness. In June 2017 during a land management plan revision, the Nantahala Ranger District on the Nantahala National Forest added  of proposed wilderness, currently called Ellicott Rock West Extension.

Ellicott Rock Wilderness is named for “Ellicott's Rock,” a rock on the east bank of the Chattooga Wild and Scenic River  on which surveyor Major Andrew Ellicott chiseled a mark in 1811 to determine the border between Georgia and North Carolina. Major Ellicott, a well-respected, sought-after surveyor, astronomer, and mathematician, was hired by the state of Georgia to ground-truth the 35th parallel and settle a border dispute between Georgia and North Carolina. The task proved long and arduous, saw difficult terrain, and the location was not accessible by horse. On December 26 with severe weather and limited food, Major Ellicott calculated the 35th parallel and inscribed the letters "N-G" on a rock along the Chattooga Wild and Scenic River. This put the Georgia-North Carolina border approximately 18 miles south of what Georgia claimed at the time. Due to Georgia's unfavorable results, Major Ellicott went unpaid for over a year and was ultimately paid a tiny fraction of the salary promised. Two years later, a group of commissioners representing both North and South Carolina set out to verify the location of Ellicott's Rock. The commissioners carved a second rock (approximately 10 feet north of Ellicott's Rock) with the inscription "Lat 35 AD 1813 NC + SC" to mark where the North Carolina and South Carolina state lines joined together. This second rock is commonly referred to as Ellicott's Rock though more accurately it is named Commissioner's Rock. Commissioner's Rock was listed in the National Register of Historic Places on July 24, 1973.

The sparkling gem within Ellicott Rock Wilderness both at the time of wilderness designation up until today is the Chattooga Wild and Scenic River. The Chattooga Wild and Scenic River bisects Ellicott Rock Wilderness, running through the heart of the wilderness. Made famous more than 45 years ago from the book and later movie, Deliverance, the Chattooga Wild and Scenic River is a prized feature among visitors to Ellicott Rock Wilderness. Many people can be found along the River enjoying the water, fishing, camping, and boating. There is a strong cultural tie to recreation uses along this river and it maintains a special place in the hearts of its frequent visitors. 

Ellicott Rock Wilderness is located in the southern tip of the Blue Ridge Mountains, a sub-mountain range of the Appalachian Mountains. It has a temperate climate with an average rainfall of 80 inches per year creating a dense forest with steep, rugged terrain. Embedded throughout the wilderness landscape are a variety of hardwood trees (creating breathtaking scenes come fall), white pines, and hemlocks with bountiful water sources including a couple waterfalls. One popular waterfall, Spoonauger Falls, is located on the Chattooga River Trail, a short quarter-mile hike from the trailhead located on Burrell's Ford road. The watershed surrounding the Chattooga Wild and Scenic River is one of the most biologically diverse in the country. The wonderful array of sights, sounds, and smells of the wild flora and fauna bring Ellicott Rock Wilderness to life. 

A variety of recreation occurs in Ellicott Rock Wilderness including hiking, camping, backpacking, fishing, hunting, kayaking, and orienteering. The Wilderness supports approximately 18 miles of designated terrestrial trails. South Carolina trails include Chattooga River Trail, East Fork Trail, Foothills Connector Trail, and a majority of the Fork Mountain Trail. North Carolina has one trail, Ellicott Rock Trail, with two trailheads along Bull Creek Road and a big river crossing in the middle. Georgia does not maintain any trails. While there are no officially designated campsites in Ellicott Rock Wilderness yet, many unofficial campsites occur along the trails, particularly along the Chattooga River trail. Unofficial campsites are primitive with no amenities.

The wilderness embodies many examples of life in the Appalachian Mountains pre-civilization and provides a wonderful escape to millions from the accustomed hustle and bustle of city life. 

What is wilderness?

Ellicott Rock Wilderness is part of the 110 million acre National Wilderness Preservation System. This system of wild federal land is designated by Congress and protected under the Wilderness Act of 1964. Wilderness land consist of some of the most wild, undisturbed places in the United States. Wilderness has five special characteristics: untrammeled, natural, undeveloped, opportunities for solitude and primitive recreation, and other features of value. Wilderness often has less recreational amenities and more restrictions and prohibitions.

See also
 List of U.S. Wilderness Areas
 Wilderness Act

References

External links 
 US Forest Service entry for Ellicott Rock Wilderness
 Wilderness Connect entry for the Ellicott Rock Wilderness
Map of Ellicott Rock Wilderness
Hiking the Appalachians and Beyond entry for Ellicott Rock Wilderness
 Sherpa Guide to the Ellicott Rock Wilderness
 TopoQuest Map showing location of Ellicott Rock

Wilderness areas of Georgia (U.S. state)
Wilderness areas of South Carolina
Wilderness areas of North Carolina
IUCN Category Ib
Wilderness areas of the Appalachians
Protected areas of Jackson County, North Carolina
Protected areas of Macon County, North Carolina
Protected areas of Rabun County, Georgia
Protected areas of Oconee County, South Carolina
Sumter National Forest
Protected areas established in 1975
Nantahala National Forest
Chattahoochee-Oconee National Forest